Faure Passage is a marine channel or passage between the Faure Islands and Kirkwood Islands in Marguerite Bay. The name "Pasaje Faure" was applied by Argentine workers in the area in association with the Faure Islands.

References 

Channels of the Southern Ocean
Straits of Graham Land
Fallières Coast